Tetracha carolina is a species of tiger beetle in the genus Tetracha. Its common name is the Carolina tiger beetle.

References

Cicindelidae
Beetles described in 1763